Anodonta cataracta, the eastern floater, is a species of large freshwater mussel, an aquatic bivalve mollusc in the family Unionidae, the river mussels.

Subspecies
Anodonta cataracta subsp. cataracta
Anodonta cataracta subsp. marginata

Description

Distribution and habitat
This mussel is present in freshwater habitats along the Atlantic coast of North America. It is found in soft-bottomed ponds, rivers and small lakes.

References

Richard A. Tankersley - Larval Brooding by the Freshwater Unionid Mussel Anodonta Cataracta  - Wake Forest University. Department of Biology, 1992
The Freshwater Mussels (Unionoida) of the World
Catalogue of Life

cataracta
Bivalves described in 1817